Ascorbyl glucoside (AA-2G) is an ascorbic acid derivative that contains at least one glycosyl group. Ascorbyl glucoside is commonly used in cosmetic products to administer vitamin C topically. Ascorbyl glucoside exhibits superior stability and penetration ability compared to ascorbyl phosphate salts, but the rate of its in vivo conversion to ascorbic acid is not known. Ascorbyl glucosides such as AA-2G, like many other derivatives of the ascorbic acid, show antiscorbutic effects. It is also sometimes used in skin whitening products.

Ascorbyl glucoside is synthesized through a glycosylation process catalyzed by glycosyltransferase-class enzymes.

See also 

 Ascorbyl palmitate

References 

Vitamin C
Glucosides
Cosmetics chemicals